Julian Guy Yonge Radcliffe  (born August 1948) is a British businessman, and the founder and chairman of the Art Loss Register (ALR).

Early life 
He was educated at Eton, followed by New College, Oxford, from where he has a degree in politics and economics.

Career 
In 1970, Radcliffe joined Hogg Robinson, as a Lloyd's of London insurance broker. He claims that in 1975, he was one of the co-founders of Control Risks, then a Hogg Robinson subsidiary, with Timothy Royle, an ex-Army officer. However, he does not appear in any company literature regarding the founding process and was likely just an early minority shareholder. In 1990, he founded the Art Loss Register. ("ALR") 

Radcliffe is the majority shareholder in the Art Loss Register, with auction houses Sotheby's (a/k/a Oatshare Ltd.) owning about 11%, Christie's about 3%.  In 1991, The International Foundation for Art Research, based in New York City, NY (USA) helped create the Art Loss Register (ALR) as a commercial enterprise to expand and market the database. IFAR managed ALR's U.S. operations through 1997. In 1998 the ALR assumed full responsibility for the IFAR database although IFAR retains ownership

In 2008, Radcliffe was heavily criticised for attempting to profit from Nazi-looted art claims after signing agreements with holocaust victims to provide services without charge. On 20 September 2013 The New York Times reported that The Art Loss Register has drawn criticism from those who say its hardball tactics push ethical, and sometimes legal, boundaries.

In 2013, Radcliffe said that the ALR has lost money for ten years, only surviving thanks to his own cash injections.
In 2014, The Times called him a "controversial figure". The Times has reported that ALR has paid informers and underworld figures for information, which some in law enforcement believe could encourage theft.   In 2013, former LA Times reporter Jason Felch uncovered that Julian Radcliffe and the Art Loss Register issued certificates of clearance for looted objects for $100.00 each with no provenance to Subhash Kapoor and his gallery, Art of the Past. These certificates allowed the looted objects to trade in the marketplace despite having been stolen from Indian temples. In 2017, the Art Loss Register was again criticised for issuing certificates of clearance for looted objects.

In 2014, Radcliffe admitted publicly that he has paid money to criminals and that some of the funds paid went to people directly connected to thefts of stolen art. Radcliffe has stated that the ALR has lost money for six years, only surviving thanks to his own cash injections. In an article published by the Times, Parisian police officer Thomas Erhardy stated that "Radcliffe ruins everything" commenting on his interference with police investigations into stolen art.

In 2015, Radcliffe's Register was found to have been in the middle of several art related disputes. Their certificates of clearance were used by looters, possessors of stolen artworks, and Nazi-looted works that appeared for sale at TEFAF. The ALR issued clearance certificates for a Nazi looted El Greco and then denied that they knew about the work. An ALR spokesman corrected his statements to the press when confronted with this issue.

As of 2016, the Art Loss Register claims to be the world's largest private database of lost and stolen art, with more than 300,000 items.

The database has over 700,000 entries in 2022.

Honours 
Radcliffe was awarded an OBE in 1999 and the QVRM in 2004 for activities unrelated to his work at the Art Loss Register. Radcliffe refers to himself as "Col. Radcliffe" which refers to his stint in the volunteer reserve Territorial Army

Personal life 
Radcliffe lives in Battersea, London, and is the owner of Lower Stanway Farm near to Much Wenlock. By 1840, Lower Stanway had become part of Sir Henry William Bayntun's Rushbury estate, and by 1909 the 293-acre property was in the ownership of the Webster family, who had previously been tenant farmers on the same land. Later it passed by marriage to Thomas Marsden, and the Marsden family owned it until 1973, when the Radcliffe family bought the farm. Lower Stanway itself is a large 19th-century brick house.

Radcliffe's favourite painting is A Cornfield, 1815, by Peter De Wint, in the collection of the V&A, London. References

References

1948 births
Alumni of New College, Oxford
Living people
People educated at Eton College
Businesspeople from Shropshire
Officers of the Order of the British Empire